The Glamorous Life (full title Sheila E. in The Glamorous Life) is the first album by the singer/drummer/percussionist Sheila E., released on June 5, 1984. The title track, "The Glamorous Life", entered the US top ten, and her second single, "The Belle of St. Mark" charted in the US, UK, Ireland, Netherlands and New Zealand.

Track listing

Personnel
Sheila E. – lead vocals, percussion, director
Jesse Johnson – guitars
David Coleman – cello on "Oliver's House" and "The Glamorous Life"
Nick DeCaro – accordion on "Next Time Wipe the Lipstick Off Your Collar"
Jill Jones aka J.J. – background vocals on "The Glamorous Life", "The Belle of St. Mark" and "Oliver's House"
Brenda Bennett – background vocals on "Next Time Wipe the Lipstick Off Your Collar"
Novi Novog – violin on "Next Time Wipe the Lipstick Off Your Collar"
Larry Williams – saxophone on "The Glamorous Life"
Prince - background vocals on "The Glamorous Life" (uncredited)

Production
Produced by The Starr Company but credited to Sheila E. and The Starr Company
Terry Christian, Peggy Mac – mixing
Bernie Grundman – mastering

Charts

References

1984 debut albums
Sheila E. albums
Albums produced by Prince (musician)
Warner Records albums